Robert "Robbie" Campbell (born 2 June 1982) is an Australian rules footballer who played for the Hawthorn Football Club and Melbourne Football Club in the Australian Football League (AFL). At 200 cm tall, he made his AFL debut with the Hawthorn Hawks in 2002. After appearing sporadically in his first few seasons, Campbell starred in 2006 with 230 disposals and 300 hit outs, playing in each of the club's 22 games.

In 2007, he became the Hawks' number one ruckman after Peter Everitt's departure to the Sydney Swans. He played in every game for the season, including two finals appearances.

Campbell has a reputation for providing value around the ground with his strength and tenacious attitude. Campbell was rewarded for his efforts with a Premiership medallion after the Hawks upset Geelong in the 2008 Grand Final.

In percentage terms, no other AFL ruckman hits the ball to the advantage of his on-ballers more often than Campbell according to jini. 

He has evolved into one of the competition’s most durable and reliable ruckmen, missing only one of the Hawks' past 71 matches. He was first for Hawthorn's hit-outs last season, averaging about 15 a match. Tough competitor who handles the ball well for his size, tackles ferociously and can fill key-position roles when needed. He finished 13th in the Best & Fairest Award (Peter Crimmins Medal) in 2007 & 2008.

Highly underrated in the AFL, Campbell got the job done for the Hawks and was a crucial part of the Premiership side, as the number one ruckman at the Hawks.

Draft History: 2001 Rookie Elevation (Hawthorn).

Retirement

Robbie announced his retirement at the 2009 Hawthorn Peter Crimmins Medal Count on 3 October due to a knee injury. A tearful Campbell thanked fans, players, his family and coaching staff in a heartfelt speech.

Comeback

He returned to football in 2010 playing in finals and including 8 games for the Box Hill Hawks (VFL) after finding out his knee wasn't as bad as they first thought. Robert then stated he would like to make a comeback to AFL football and would enter the draft at the end of 2010.

Campbell was selected by the Melbourne Demons during round 5 at pick number 63 in the 2011 Rookie Draft. Due to Melbourne's strong ruck depth in 2011, notably Mark Jamar Campbell was unable to break into Melbourne's senior team. As a result, he retired at the end of the season.

Statistics

|- style=background:#EAEAEA
| 2002 ||  || 39
| 7 || 0 || 0 || 27 || 19 || 46 || 14 || 24 || 60 || 0.0 || 0.0 || 3.9 || 2.7 || 6.6 || 2.0 || 3.4 || 8.6 || 0
|-
| 2003 ||  || 39
| 10 || 0 || 1 || 29 || 24 || 53 || 16 || 23 || 130 || 0.0 || 0.1 || 2.9 || 2.4 || 5.3 || 1.6 || 2.3 || 13.0 || 0
|- style=background:#EAEAEA
| 2004 ||  || 39
| 14 || 1 || 0 || 28 || 40 || 68 || 17 || 24 || 121 || 0.1 || 0.0 || 2.0 || 2.9 || 4.9 || 1.2 || 1.7 || 8.6 || 0
|-
| 2005 ||  || 39
| 1 || 0 || 0 || 1 || 3 || 4 || 0 || 4 || 18 || 0.0 || 0.0 || 1.0 || 3.0 || 4.0 || 0.0 || 4.0 || 18.0 || 0
|- style=background:#EAEAEA
| 2006 ||  || 39
| 22 || 10 || 6 || 82 || 148 || 230 || 75 || 56 || 300 || 0.5 || 0.3 || 3.7 || 6.7 || 10.5 || 3.4 || 2.5 || 13.6 || 0
|-
| 2007 ||  || 39
| 24 || 6 || 2 || 70 || 173 || 243 || 71 || 54 || 385 || 0.3 || 0.1 || 2.9 || 7.2 || 10.1 || 3.0 || 2.3 || 16.0 || 0
|- style=background:#EAEAEA
| bgcolor=F0E68C | 2008# ||  || 39
| 24 || 7 || 1 || 93 || 160 || 253 || 84 || 55 || 358 || 0.3 || 0.0 || 3.9 || 6.7 || 10.5 || 3.5 || 2.3 || 14.9 || 0
|-
| 2009 ||  || 39
| 14 || 1 || 0 || 38 || 98 || 136 || 35 || 23 || 94 || 0.1 || 0.0 || 2.7 || 7.0 || 9.7 || 2.5 || 1.6 || 6.7 || 0
|- style=background:#EAEAEA
| 2011 ||  || 26
| 0 || — || — || — || — || — || — || — || — || — || — || — || — || — || — || — || — || 0
|- class="sortbottom"
! colspan=3| Career
! 116 !! 25 !! 10 !! 368 !! 665 !! 1033 !! 312 !! 263 !! 1466 !! 0.2 !! 0.1 !! 3.2 !! 5.7 !! 8.9 !! 2.7 !! 2.3 !! 12.6 !! 0
|}

Honours and achievements
Team
 AFL premiership player: 2008
 VFL premiership player: 2001

Individual
 Box Hill All-Stars team (1999–2019)

References

External links

1982 births
Living people
Australian rules footballers from Victoria (Australia)
Hawthorn Football Club players
Hawthorn Football Club Premiership players
Box Hill Football Club players
Casey Demons players
One-time VFL/AFL Premiership players